"Tell Me What You See" is a song by the English rock band the Beatles that first appeared in 1965 on their album Help! in the United Kingdom and on Beatles VI in the United States. The song is credited to Lennon–McCartney  but mainly written by Paul McCartney.  Regarding the song's authorship, McCartney said, "I seem to remember it as mine. I would claim it as a 60–40 but it might have been totally me." John Lennon said, in his interviews with Playboy (1980) and Hit Parader (1972), that "Tell Me What You See" was written completely by McCartney.

Composition

"Tell Me What You See" was deemed by McCartney, "Not awfully memorable", in an interview with author Barry Miles. Following each repetition of the title phrase, there is a brief instrumental break featuring a Hohner Pianet. The instrument is featured on two other tracks on Help!: "You Like Me Too Much" and "The Night Before", both recorded the day before "Tell Me What You See." Ringo Starr's drumming on the track is augmented with a trio of percussion instruments; a güiro, a tambourine, and a pair of claves. This is not the first time the Beatles had used additional percussion instruments to flesh out their sound, having done so as early as "Don't Bother Me" in 1963.

Evident in the song's structure and instrumentation are the Beatles' then growing folk influence, with lyrics more mature and reflective than was standard in their earlier output. The line "trying to get to you" (the title of an early Elvis Presley song recorded for Sun Records, which served as inspiration for McCartney and George Harrison's composition "In Spite of All the Danger") reflects the band's continued love of early rock and roll. Other songs on Help!, such as Lennon's "You've Got to Hide Your Love Away" and the title track, also exhibit compositional growth.

A verse in the song, beginning with the line "Big and black the clouds may be", was taken from a religious inscription that had hung in Lennon's childhood home in Liverpool: "However black the clouds may be, in time they’ll pass away. Have faith and trust and you will see, God’s light make bright your day." The same inscription was parodied by Lennon in his 1965 book A Spaniard in the Works.

Personnel
Paul McCartney – lead vocal, bass, electric piano 
John Lennon – lead vocal, rhythm guitar, tambourine
George Harrison – güiro
Ringo Starr – drums, claves
Personnel per Ian MacDonald except where noted.

Notes

References

External links 
 

The Beatles songs
Song recordings produced by George Martin
Songs written by Lennon–McCartney
Songs published by Northern Songs
1965 songs